Pascal's wager is a philosophical argument presented by the seventeenth-century French mathematician, philosopher, physicist and theologian Blaise Pascal (1623–1662). It posits that human beings wager with their lives that God either exists or does not.

The wager stems from Pascal's deep seated devotion to God and to Christianity.  Pascal's motives come from wanting to convert others to Christianity through logic and reason.

Pascal argues that a rational person should live as though God exists and seek to believe in God. If God does not exist, such a person will have only a finite loss (some pleasures, luxury, etc.), whereas if God does exist, they stand to receive infinite gains (as represented by eternity in Heaven) and avoid infinite losses (an eternity in Hell).

The original wager was set out in Pascal's posthumously published Pensées ("Thoughts"), an assembly of previously unpublished notes. Pascal's wager charted new territory in probability theory, marked the first formal use of decision theory, existentialism, pragmatism, and voluntarism.

The wager is commonly criticized with counterarguments such as the failure to prove the existence of God, the argument from inconsistent revelations, and the argument from inauthentic belief.

The wager 

The wager uses the following logic (excerpts from Pensées, part III, §233):

 God is, or God is not. Reason cannot decide between the two alternatives
 A Game is being played... where heads or tails will turn up
 You must wager (it is not optional)
 Let us weigh the gain and the loss in wagering that God is. Let us estimate these two chances. If you gain, you gain all; if you lose, you lose nothing
 Wager, then, without hesitation that He is. (...) There is here an infinity of an infinitely happy life to gain, a chance of gain against a finite number of chances of loss, and what you stake is finite. And so our proposition is of infinite force when there is the finite to stake in a game where there are equal risks of gain and of loss, and the infinite to gain.
 But some cannot believe. They should then 'at least learn your inability to believe...' and 'Endeavour then to convince' themselves.

Pascal asks the reader to analyze humankind's position, where our actions can be enormously consequential, but our understanding of those consequences is flawed. While we can discern a great deal through reason, we are ultimately forced to gamble. Pascal cites a number of distinct areas of uncertainty in human life:

Pascal describes humanity as a finite being trapped within an incomprehensible infinity, briefly thrust into being from non-being, with no explanation of "Why?" or "What?" or "How?" On Pascal's view, human finitude constrains our ability to achieve truth reliably.

Given that reason alone cannot determine whether God exists, Pascal concludes that this question functions as a coin toss. However, even if we do not know the outcome of this coin toss, we must base our actions on some expectation about the consequence. We must decide whether to live as though God exists, or whether to live as though God does not exist, even though we may be mistaken in either case.

In Pascal's assessment, participation in this wager is not optional. Merely by existing in a state of uncertainty, we are forced to choose between the available courses of action for practical purposes.

Pascal's description of the wager 

The Pensées passage on Pascal's wager is as follows:

Pascal begins by painting a situation where both the existence and non-existence of God are impossible to prove by human reason. So, supposing that reason cannot determine the truth between the two options, one must "wager" by weighing the possible consequences. Pascal's assumption is that, when it comes to making the decision, no one can refuse to participate; withholding assent is impossible because we are already "embarked", effectively living out the choice.

We only have two things to stake, our "reason" and our "happiness". Pascal considers that if there is "equal risk of loss and gain" (i.e. a coin toss), then human reason is powerless to address the question of whether God exists. That being the case, then human reason can only decide the question according to possible resulting happiness of the decision, weighing the gain and loss in believing that God exists and likewise in believing that God does not exist.

He points out that if a wager were between the equal chance of gaining two lifetimes of happiness and gaining nothing, then a person would be a fool to bet on the latter. The same would go if it were three lifetimes of happiness versus nothing. He then argues that it is simply unconscionable by comparison to betting against an eternal life of happiness for the possibility of gaining nothing. The wise decision is to wager that God exists, since "If you gain, you gain all; if you lose, you lose nothing", meaning one can gain eternal life if God exists, but if not, one will be no worse off in death than if one had not believed. On the other hand, if you bet against God, win or lose, you either gain nothing or lose everything. You are either unavoidably annihilated (in which case, nothing matters one way or the other) or miss the opportunity of eternal happiness. In note 194, speaking about those who live apathetically betting against God, he sums up by remarking, "It is to the glory of religion to have for enemies men so unreasonable..."

Inability to believe 

Pascal addressed the difficulty that 'reason' and 'rationality' pose to genuine belief by proposing that "acting as if [one] believed" could "cure [one] of unbelief":

Analysis with decision theory 

The possibilities defined by Pascal's wager can be thought of as a decision under uncertainty with the values of the following decision matrix.

Given these values, the option of living as if God exists (B) dominates the option of living as if God does not exist (¬B), as long as one assumes a positive probability that God exists. In other words, the expected value gained by choosing B is greater than or equal to that of choosing ¬B.

In fact, according to decision theory, the only value that matters in the above matrix is the +∞ (infinitely positive).  Any matrix of the following type (where f1, f2, and f3 are all negative or finite positive numbers) results in (B) as being the only rational decision.

Misunderstanding of the wager 

Pascal's intent was not to provide an argument to convince atheists to believe, but (a) to show the fallacy of attempting to use logical arguments to prove or disprove God, and (b) to persuade atheists to sinlessness, as an aid to attaining faith ("it is this which will lessen the passions, which are your stumbling-blocks"). As Laurent Thirouin writes (note that the numbering of the items in the Pensees is not standardized; Thirouin's 418 is this article's 233):

To be put at the beginning of Pascal's planned book, the wager was meant to show that logical reasoning cannot support faith or lack thereof:

Pascal's intended book was precisely to find other ways to establish the value of faith, a justification for the Christian faith.

Criticism 

Criticism of Pascal's wager began in his own day, and came from atheists, who questioned the "benefits" of a deity whose "realm" is beyond reason and the religiously orthodox, who primarily took issue with the wager's deistic and agnostic language. It is criticized for not proving God's existence, the encouragement of false belief, and the problem of which religion and which God should be worshipped.

Laplace 

The probabilist mathematician Pierre Simon de Laplace ridiculed the use of probability in theology. Even following Pascal's reasoning, it is not worth making a bet, for the hope of profit – equal to the product of the value of the testimonies (infinitely small) and the value of the happiness they promise (which is significant but finite) – must necessarily be infinitely small.

Failure to prove the existence of God 

Voltaire (another prominent French writer of the Enlightenment), a generation after Pascal, regarded the idea of the wager as a "proof of God" as "indecent and childish", adding, "the interest I have to believe a thing is no proof that such a thing exists". Pascal, however, did not advance the wager as a proof of God's existence but rather as a necessary pragmatic decision which is "impossible to avoid" for any living person. He argued that abstaining from making a wager is not an option and that "reason is incapable of divining the truth"; thus, a decision of whether to believe in the existence of God must be made by "considering the consequences of each possibility".

Voltaire's critique concerns not the nature of the Pascalian wager as proof of God's existence, but the contention that the very belief Pascal tried to promote is not convincing. Voltaire hints at the fact that Pascal, as a Jansenist, believed that only a small, and already predestined, portion of humanity would eventually be saved by God.

Voltaire explained that no matter how far someone is tempted with rewards to believe in Christian salvation, the result will be at best a faint belief.  Pascal, in his Pensées, agrees with this, not stating that people can choose to believe (and therefore make a safe wager), but rather that some cannot believe.

As Étienne Souriau explained, in order to accept Pascal's argument, the bettor needs to be certain that God seriously intends to honour the bet; he says that the wager assumes that God also accepts the bet, which is not proved; Pascal's bettor is here like the fool who seeing a leaf floating on a river's waters and quivering at some point, for a few seconds, between the two sides of a stone, says: "I bet a million with Rothschild that it takes finally the left path." And, effectively, the leaf passed on the left side of the stone, but unfortunately for the fool Rothschild never said "I [will take that] bet".

Argument from inconsistent revelations 

Since there have been many religions throughout history, and therefore many conceptions of God (or gods), some assert that all of them need to be factored into the wager, in an argumentation known as the argument from inconsistent revelations. This, its proponents argue, would lead to a high probability of believing in "the wrong god", which, they claim, eliminates the mathematical advantage Pascal claimed with his wager. Denis Diderot, a contemporary of Voltaire, concisely expressed this opinion when asked about the wager, saying "an Imam could reason the same way". J. L. Mackie notes that "the church within which alone salvation is to be found is not necessarily the Church of Rome, but perhaps that of the Anabaptists or the Mormons or the Muslim Sunnis or the worshipers of Kali or of Odin."

Pascal considers this type of objection briefly in the notes compiled into the Pensées, and dismisses it as obviously wrong and disingenuous:

Pascal says that the skepticism of unbelievers who rest content with the many-religions objection has seduced them into a fatal "repose". If they were really bent on knowing the truth, they would be persuaded to examine "in detail" whether Christianity is like any other religion, but they just cannot be bothered. Their objection might be sufficient were the subject concerned merely some "question in philosophy", but not "here, where everything is at stake". In "a matter where they themselves, their eternity, their all are concerned", they can manage no better than "a superficial reflection" ("une reflexion légère") and, thinking they have scored a point by asking a leading question, they go off to amuse themselves.

As Pascal scholars observe, Pascal regarded the many-religions objection as a rhetorical ploy, a "trap" that he had no intention of falling into.

David Wetsel notes that Pascal's treatment of the pagan religions is brisk: "As far as Pascal is concerned, the demise of the pagan religions of antiquity speaks for itself. Those pagan religions which still exist in the New World, in India, and in Africa are not even worth a second glance. They are obviously the work of superstition and ignorance and have nothing in them which might interest 'les gens habiles' ('clever men')". Islam warrants more attention, being distinguished from paganism (which for Pascal presumably includes all the other non-Christian religions) by its claim to be a revealed religion. Nevertheless, Pascal concludes that the religion founded by Mohammed can on several counts be shown to be devoid of divine authority, and that therefore, as a path to the knowledge of God, it is as much a dead end as paganism." Judaism, in view of its close links to Christianity, he deals with elsewhere.

The many-religions objection is taken more seriously by some later apologists of the wager, who argue that of the rival options only those awarding infinite happiness affect the wager's dominance. In the opinion of these apologists "finite, semi-blissful promises such as Kali's or Odin's" therefore drop out of consideration.  Also, the infinite bliss that the rival conception of God offers has to be mutually exclusive. If Christ's promise of bliss can be attained concurrently with Jehovah's and Allah's (all three being identified as the God of Abraham), there is no conflict in the decision matrix in the case where the cost of believing in the wrong conception of God is neutral (limbo/purgatory/spiritual death), although this would be countered with an infinite cost in the case where not believing in the correct conception of God results in punishment (hell).

Ecumenical interpretations of the wager argues that it could even be suggested that believing in a generic God, or a god by the wrong name, is acceptable so long as that conception of God has similar essential characteristics of the conception of God considered in Pascal's wager (perhaps the God of Aristotle).  Proponents of this line of reasoning suggest that either all of the conceptions of God or gods throughout history truly boil down to just a small set of "genuine options", or that if Pascal's wager can simply bring a person to believe in "generic theism", it has done its job.

Pascal argues implicitly for the uniqueness of Christianity in the wager itself, writing: "If there is a God, He is infinitely incomprehensible...Who then can blame the Christians for not being able to give reasons for their beliefs, professing as they do a religion which they cannot explain by reason?"

Argument from inauthentic belief 

Some critics argue that Pascal's wager, for those who cannot believe, suggests feigning belief to gain eternal reward. Richard Dawkins argues that this would be dishonest and immoral and that, in addition to this, it is absurd to think that God, being just and omniscient, would not see through this deceptive strategy on the part of the "believer", thus nullifying the benefits of the wager.

Since these criticisms are concerned not with the validity of the wager itself, but with its possible aftermath—namely that a person who has been convinced of the overwhelming odds in favor of belief might still find himself unable to sincerely believe—they are tangential to the thrust of the wager. What such critics are objecting to is Pascal's subsequent advice to an unbeliever who, having concluded that the only rational way to wager is in favor of God's existence, points out, reasonably enough, that this by no means makes him a believer. This hypothetical unbeliever complains, "I am so made that I cannot believe. What would you have me do?" Pascal, far from suggesting that God can be deceived by outward show, says that God does not regard it at all: "God looks only at what is inward." For a person who is already convinced of the odds of the wager but cannot seem to put his heart into the belief, he offers practical advice.

Explicitly addressing the question of inability to believe, Pascal argues that if the wager is valid, the inability to believe is irrational, and therefore must be caused by feelings: "your inability to believe, because reason compels you to [believe] and yet you cannot, [comes] from your passions." This inability, therefore, can be overcome by diminishing these irrational sentiments: "Learn from those who were bound like you. . . . Follow the way by which they began; by acting as if they believed, taking the holy water, having masses said, etc. Even this will naturally make you believe, and deaden your acuteness.—'But this is what I am afraid of.'—And why? What have you to lose?"

An uncontroversial doctrine in both Roman Catholic and Protestant theology is that mere belief in God is insufficient to attain salvation, the standard cite being James 2:19 (KJV): "Thou believest that there is one God; thou doest well: the devils also believe, and tremble." Salvation requires "faith" not just in the sense of belief, but of trust and obedience. Pascal and his sister, a nun, were among the leaders of Roman Catholicism's Jansenist school of thought whose doctrine of salvation was close to Protestantism in emphasizing faith over works. Both Jansenists and Protestants followed St. Augustine in this emphasis (Martin Luther belonged to the Augustinian Order of monks). Augustine wrote

Since Pascal's position was that "saving" belief in God required more than logical assent, accepting the wager could only be a first step. Hence his advice on what steps one could take to arrive at belief.

Some other critics have objected to Pascal's wager on the grounds that he wrongly assumes what type of epistemic character God would likely value in his rational creatures if he existed.

Variations and other wager arguments 

 The sophist Protagoras had an agnostic position regarding the gods, but he nevertheless continued to worship the gods. This could be considered as an early version of the Wager.
 In the famous tragedy of Euripides Bacchae, Kadmos states an early version of Pascal's wager. It is noteworthy that at the end of the tragedy Dionysos, the god to whom Kadmos referred, appears and punishes him for thinking in this way. Euripides, quite clearly, considered and dismissed the wager in this tragedy.
 The stoic philosopher and Roman Emperor Marcus Aurelius expressed a similar sentiment in the second book of Meditations, saying "Since it is possible that thou mayest depart from life this very moment, regulate every act and thought accordingly. But to go away from among men, if there are gods, is not a thing to be afraid of, for the gods will not involve thee in evil; but if indeed they do not exist, or if they have no concern about human affairs, what is it to me to live in a universe devoid of gods or devoid of Providence?"
 The early Buddhist texts contain passages which defend a Buddhist wager argument for believing in an afterlife.
 In the Sanskrit classic Sārasamuccaya, Vararuci makes a similar argument to Pascal's wager.
 Muslim Imam Ja'far al-Sadiq is recorded to have postulated variations of the wager on several occasions in different forms, including his famed 'Tradition of the Myrobalan Fruit.' In the Shi'i hadith book al-Kafi, al-Sadiq declares to an atheist "If what you say is correct – and it is not – then we will both succeed. But if what I say is correct – and it is – then I will succeed, and you will be destroyed."
 An instantiation of this argument, within the Islamic kalam tradition, was discussed by Imam al-Haramayn al-Juwayni (d. 478/1085) in his Kitab al-irshad ila-qawati al-adilla fi usul al-i'tiqad, or A Guide to the Conclusive Proofs for the Principles of Belief. 
 The Christian apologist Arnobius of Sicca (d. 330) stated an early version of the argument in his book Against the Pagans, arguing "is it not more rational, of two things uncertain and hanging in doubtful suspense, rather to believe that which carries with it some hopes, than that which brings none at all?"
 A close parallel just before Pascal's time occurred in the Jesuit Antoine Sirmond's On the Immortality of the Soul (1635), which explicitly compared the choice of religion to playing dice and argued "However long and happy the space of this life may be, while ever you place it in the other pan of the balance against a blessed and flourishing eternity, surely it will seem to you ... that the pan will rise on high."
 The Atheist's Wager, popularised by the philosopher Michael Martin and published in his 1990 book Atheism: A Philosophical Justification, is an atheistic wager argument in response to Pascal's wager.
 A 2008 philosophy book, How to Make Good Decisions and Be Right All the Time, presents a secular revision of Pascal's wager: “What does it hurt to pursue value and virtue? If there is value, then we have everything to gain, but if there is none, then we haven’t lost anything.... Thus, we should seek value.”
 Pascal's Mugging, a dialogue written by philosopher Nick Bostrom, shows that a rational victim can be made to give up his wallet in exchange for a weakly credible promise of astronomical repayment. As in Pascal's Wager, a small but certain downside is outweighed by a large but unlikely upside.
 Roko's basilisk is a hypothetical future superintelligence that punishes everyone who failed to help bring it into existence.
 In a 2014 article, philosopher Justin McBrayer argued we ought to remain agnostic about the existence of God but nonetheless believe because of the good that comes in the present life from believing in God. "The gist of the renewed wager is that theists do better than non-theists regardless of whether or not God exists."

Climate change 

Since at least 1992, some scholars have analogized Pascal's wager to decisions about catastrophic climate change. Two differences from Pascal's wager are posited regarding climate change: first, climate change is more likely than Pascal's God to exist, as there is scientific evidence for one but not the other. Secondly, the calculated penalty for unchecked climate catastrophe would be large, but is not generally considered to be infinite. Magnate Warren Buffett has written that climate change "bears a similarity to Pascal's Wager on the Existence of God. Pascal, it may be recalled, argued that if there were only a tiny probability that God truly existed, it made sense to behave as if He did because the rewards could be infinite whereas the lack of belief risked eternal misery. Likewise, if there is only a 1% chance the planet is heading toward a truly major disaster and delay means passing a point of no return, inaction now is foolhardy."

See also 

 A Confession
 Appeal to consequences
 Argumentum ad baculum
 Atheist's Wager
 Christian existential apologetics
 Cromwell's rule
 Ecclesiastes
 Evil God Challenge
 Lewis's trilemma
 Four Assurances
 Buddhist wager argument for rebirth
 Pascal's mugging
 Pensées

Notes

References 

 

 Armour, Leslie. Infini Rien: Pascal's Wager and the Human Paradox. The Journal of the History of Philosophy Monograph Series. Carbondale: Southern Illinois University Press, 1993.
 Cargile, James. "Pascal's Wager". Contemporary Perspectives on Religious Epistemology. R. Douglas Geivett and Brendan Sweetman, eds. Oxford University Press, 1992.
 Dawkins, Richard. "Pascal's Wager". The God Delusion. Black Swan, 2007.
 Holowecky, Elizabeth. "Taxes and God". KPMG Press, 2008. (Phone interview)
 Jordan, Jeff, ed. Gambling on God. Lanham MD: Rowman & Littlefield, 1994. (A collection of recent articles on the Wager with a bibliography.)
 Jordan, Jeff. Pascal's Wager: Pragmatic Arguments and Belief in God. Oxford University Press, 2007.
 Lycan, William G. and George N. Schlesinger, "You Bet Your Life: Pascal's Wager Defended". Contemporary Perspectives on Religious Epistemology. R. Douglas Geivett and Brendan Sweetman, eds. Oxford University Press, 1992.
 Martin, Michael. Atheism. Philadelphia: Temple University Press, 1990. (Pp. 229–238 presents the argument about a god who punishes believers.)
 Morris, Thomas V. "Pascalian Wagering". Contemporary Perspectives on Religious Epistemology. R. Douglas Geivett and Brendan Sweetman, eds. Oxford University Press, 1992.
 Rescher, Nicholas. Pascal's Wager: A Study of Practical Reasoning in Philosophical Theology. University of Notre Dame Press, 1985. (The first book-length treatment of the Wager in English.)
 Whyte, Jamie. Crimes against Logic. McGraw-Hill, 2004. (Section with argument about Wager)

External links 

 Pascal's Pensees Part III — "The Necessity of the Wager" (Trotter translation), at Classical Library (Wager found at #233)
 Section III of Blaise Pascal's Pensées, Translated by W. F. Trotter (with foreword by T. S. Eliot), at Project Gutenburg (Wager found at #233)
 Pascal's Wager in the Internet Encyclopedia of Philosophy
 Pascal's Wager in the Stanford Encyclopedia of Philosophy
 Pascal's Wager: Pragmatic Arguments and Belief in God (2006) by Jeff Jordan, University of Delaware, 2006
 Ambiguity, Pessimism, and Rational Religious Choice (2010) by Tigran Melkonyan and Mark Pingle, Theory and Decision, 2010, Volume 69, Number 3, Pages 417–438
 The Rejection of Pascal's Wager by Paul Tobin
 Pascal's Mugging by Nick Bostrom
 Theistic Belief and Religious Uncertainty by Jeffrey Jordan

Arguments for the existence of God
Blaise Pascal
Christian apologetics
Christian philosophy
Philosophical arguments
Probability theory
Thought experiments
Wagering
Infinity